The Church of Our Lady of Esperanza is a Roman Catholic parish church in the Roman Catholic Archdiocese of New York, located at 624 West 156th Street between Broadway and Riverside Drive in the Washington Heights neighborhood of Upper Manhattan in New York City.

The church is part of Audubon Terrace, which was designated a Historic District by the New York City Landmarks Preservation Commission on January 9, 1979, but it is organizationally separate from the museum complex.

History
The parish was founded by Dona Manuela de Laverrerie de Barril, the wife of the Spanish Consul-General in New York. Archer Milton Huntington, the railroad heir and founder of the Hispanic Society of America, was recruited to the cause and funded the project for the second Spanish-speaking Catholic church in New York. The church building was begun in 1909 to designs by Archer's cousin, Charles P. Huntington.  The building was enlarged and extended in 1924 by Lawrence G. White, son of Stanford White, including an addition on 156th Street.  Previously, the entrance to the church, which sat on a hill, was by way of an outdoor brick stairway with terra cotta balustrades, but White's addition allowed for an entrance at the street level, with the climb to the church occurring via an indoor staircase.

The first pastor, in 1912, was the Rev. Adrian Buisson, formerly pastor of the Church of Our Lady of Guadalupe at 229 West 14th Street. Upon his retirement in 1952, the Rev. Francis Soutberg "was appointed Pastor until 1955 when Father Bernard Guillett assumed the position. Presently the Reverend Monsignor Peter O'Donnell is pastor."

References

External links

1909 establishments in New York City
Roman Catholic churches completed in 1912
Christian organizations established in 1909
Beaux-Arts architecture in New York City
Roman Catholic churches in Manhattan
Spanish-American culture in New York City
Washington Heights, Manhattan
20th-century Roman Catholic church buildings in the United States